Roger Sanchez (born June 1, 1967) is a Dominican-American house music DJ, remixer and producer. He won a Grammy Award for his remix of "Hella Good" by No Doubt in 2003, and is best known for his song "Another Chance", which was an international hit in 2001. He is a four time DJ Awards winner for "Best House DJ" in 1999, 2002, 2004 and 2007 and has received twelve nominations in total. He won the first International Dance Music Award for Best Podcast in 2007 and has received 8 IDMA nominations for Best American DJ (2003–2010).

Musical career
Sanchez began to play nightclubs in New York City, and later around the world. Along with fellow New York house DJs Erick Morillo, David Morales and Danny Tenaglia, Sanchez has become well known in the European club circuit, especially on the Spanish island of Ibiza. He has maintained residency on there every summer since 2000.

Sanchez has scored numerous hits in the European and World Charts with both his own music and the remixes he has created for an array of superstars including Diana Ross, Kylie Minogue, Daft Punk, Madonna, The Police, No Doubt and Maroon 5. In 2003, he won his first Grammy Award for Best Remixed Recording for his remix of No Doubt's "Hella Good". He hosts a weekly terrestrial and online radio show called Release Yourself, with 15 million listeners worldwide. Along with the radio show, Sanchez hosts a bi-weekly podcast, distributed internationally. In 2007 the podcast was awarded the first-ever Best Podcast Award at the International Dance Music Awards (IDMA). On December 21, 2020, the podcast aired its 1000th episode.

On October 28, 2009, DJ Magazine announced the results of their annual Top 100 DJ Poll, with Ultra Records Sanchez placed at number 60.

Roger is also the founder of his own label in 2002, Stealth Records. Yearly, Sanchez curates a series of compilation albums called Release Yourself, which are known for their blend of deep house, Latin, tribal and tech sounds.

In 2018 Roger created an educational masterclass to teach aspiring DJs.

Discography

Studio albums
 Secret Weapons Volume 1 (1994)
 Secret Weapons Volume 2 (1995)
 First Contact (2001)
 Come with Me (2006)
 Best Of The Times (2007) w/ Todd Terry
 Release Yourself – 10th Anniversary Edition (2010)

Singles

Selected remixes
 Michael Jackson – "Don't Stop 'Til You Get Enough" (1992)
 Michael Jackson – "Jam"
 Tom Tom Club – "Sunshine & Ecstasy" (1992)
 Kenny "Dope" González Presents Axxis – "All I'm Askin'" (1992)
 Lisa Stansfield – "So Natural" (1993)
 M People – "Renaissance" (1994)
 Janet Jackson and Luther Vandross – "The Best Things in Life Are Free" (1995)
 Definition of Sound – "Pass the Vibes" (1995)
 Janet Jackson – "Love Will Never Do (Without You)" (1996)
 Jamiroquai – "High Times" (1997)
 Michael Jackson – "Dangerous" (1997)
 Jamiroquai – "Deeper Underground" (1998)
 Daft Punk – "Revolution 909" (1998)
 Lenny Kravitz – "Black Velveteen" (1999)
 Wamdue Project – "King of My Castle" (1999)
 Garbage – "Cherry Lips" (2001)
 Alicia Keys – "Butterflyz" (2002)
 Anastacia – "Paid My Dues" (2002)
 Kylie Minogue – "In Your Eyes" (2002)
 No Doubt – "Hella Good" (2002)
 Texas – "I'll See It Through" (2003)
 Cirque Du Soleil — "Kumbalawé" (2005)
 Madonna – "Get Together" (2006)
 Robyn – "Be Mine!" (2007)
 Depeche Mode – "Perfect" (2009)
 Sérgio Mendes – "Pais Tropical" (2010)
 OneRepublic – "Secrets" (2010)
 Maroon 5 – "Give a Little More" (2010)
 Brandon Flowers – "Only The Young" (2010)
 Miguel Bosé – "Cardio" (2010)
 Robbie Williams – "Last Days of Disco" (2010)
 Seether – "Dragon in Me (Desire for Need)" (2014)
 Nicky Romero and Nile Rodgers – "Future Funk" (as S-Man) (2016)
 Fiorious - "Follow Me" (2020)

Credentials
 Featured in Hang the DJ by Marco & Mauro La Villa
 Cannes Film Festival, France

Awards and nominations

DJ rankings
The DJ List ranking

The DJ List has approximately 1 million members who rate DJs in different EDM genres, these are the statistics for The DJ List as of November 6, 2015.

Top Deejays ranking

Topdeejays is a global DJ database founded and operated by FM Agencija it uses an algorithm that measures general social media influence of a DJ by combining their Facebook, Twitter, Google Plus, SoundCloud, MySpace, Last.fm and YouTube fans, subscribers and followers TDJ calculates and applies TDJ points to in order rank artists global, national and by genre influence. These are the statistics for topdeejays as of November 6, 2015.

DJ Rankings The Official Global DJ Rankings is calculated according to an advanced algorithm, compiled to give an accurate, independent and fair ranking of all DJs it considers the following criteria DJ earnings.Media presence, Chart data from music releases and remixes, Airplay data from radio stations. Public data about royalties collected from copyright associations, Followers on major social networks, such as Facebook, Twitter etc. and Polling and rating data from various polling agencies and rating sites, such as dj-rating.com and djmag.com.

References

External links
Official Website

American dance musicians
American house musicians
American people of Dominican Republic descent
Club DJs
House DJs
DJs from New York City
Electronic dance music DJs
1967 births
Living people
Grammy Award winners
People from Queens, New York
Remixers
Hispanic and Latino American musicians
Place of birth missing (living people)
High School of Art and Design alumni
Pratt Institute alumni